Enso Group is a multinational diversified conglomerate that has global operations across a wide range of industries, and is valued at over $6 Billion. The group was founded in 2005 by Chairman Vinay Maloo. It was started with a cluster of oil & gas E&P companies in Jordan, Nigeria, Georgia, Australia and India. The group has consultancy arm(s) in UK and Singapore with operational offices globally. They have business interests and investments worldwide, across a list of countries. Most of the group companies are privately held. Vaibhav Maloo holds the position of managing director of the group.

Enso Foundation
Enso Foundation is set up with a mission to uplift underprivileged sections of society, work on animal welfare, nature preservation, education and healthcare.  The Group has contributed to NGO's working towards underprivileged children education and healthcare in India and around the world. Enso Foundation is associated with Tour De India since 2013.

Natural resources

Potash mining
The group has expanded horizontally with purchasing controlling stake in operations of a potash mining project in Saskatchewan province of Canada, an area which has one of the highest reserves of potash in the world. Potash is an ore that leads to products used in agriculture.

Energy
Enso Group has stake in a major gas block in Siberian region of Russia, near Irkutsk. The group sold its stake in Ensearch Petroleum, which had its holdings in 14 oil and gas blocks to Sahara India Pariwar in 2011.

Healthcare
A PPP initiative of Enso Healthcare LLP, and Enso Care, was launched with GE-Wipro and Government of Maharashtra & another one in Punjab with Philips but the group exited before rollout and curbed its healthcare expansion plans.
Enso Healthcare would have provided diagnostic healthcare services to 140 million people in the Indian states of Maharashtra and Punjab under Public Private Partnership(PPP) model if they had gone ahead with the rollout.

Enso Healthcare LLP is acting as an aggregator for manufacturing of Sputnik V and Sputnik Light vaccines in India, for Russian sovereign fund RDIF.

Solar
The group is into solar products assembly and has executed many turnkey products in India.

Infrastructure
The 12.1 km Gurgaon metro rail, called Rapid Metro Gurgaon, was created in JV with Enso Group and a consortium of DLF and IL&FS. The group exited the project, however, soon after operations began. The joint venture SPV was called ITNL Enso Rail Systems Ltd. The metro runs today and has 11 hauls.

See also
Vinay Maloo
Tour de India

References

External links 
 Official website

Indian companies established in 2005
Conglomerate companies of India
Conglomerate companies established in 2005
Companies based in Mumbai
2005 establishments in Maharashtra